Reverse psychology is a technique involving the assertion of a belief or behavior that is opposite to the one desired, with the expectation that this approach will encourage the subject of the persuasion to do what is actually desired. This technique relies on the psychological phenomenon of reactance, in which a person has a negative emotional reaction to being persuaded, and thus chooses the option which is being advocated against. This may work especially well on a person who is resistant by nature, while direct requests work best for people who are compliant. The one being manipulated is usually unaware of what is really going on.

Among adolescents 
Susan Fowler writes, "Beware that such strategies [of reverse psychology] can backfire. Children can sense manipulation a mile away." She instead recommends leading by example.

Reverse psychology is often used on children due to their high tendency to respond with reactance, a desire to restore threatened freedom of action. Questions have, however been raised about such an approach when it is more than merely instrumental, in the sense that "reverse psychology implies a clever manipulation of the misbehaving child"

The psychology professor John Gottman advises against using reverse psychology on teens on the presumption that they will rebel, stating that "such strategies are confusing, manipulative, dishonest, and they rarely work." A typical example of using reverse psychology among adolescents is a parent openly disapproving of their child's romantic relationship, with the objective being to encourage the pursuit of the opposite behavior.

This psychological approach has proven to be particularly effective with adolescents as many of these are prone to rebellious tendencies and will frequently behave in a manner antithetical to the advice of well-meaning authority figures.

Psychological reactance theory 
Reverse psychology can fall under many different psychological influence techniques. Reverse psychology is sometimes referred to as psychological reactance, the aroused state that occurs when freedom is threatened or eliminated. The higher stake or more freedoms that are threatened, the more arousal that can be expected. People prefer to be free to select what they like. When that freedom is taken away, they are motivated to restore it. Psychological reactance can be better explained as the idea that an item will be wanted more if people are told they cannot have it, which can relate to reverse psychology on some levels. Another influence technique that relates to reverse psychology is strategic self-anticonformity. Strategic self-anticonformity is when a person advocates a position opposite of their true thought while hiding the fact that they are using a persuasion tactic. A typical example of such is marketing techniques or tricks such as "do not click this link" or "do not push this button." Strategic self-anticonformity and psychological reactance relate to their expected negativity or disagreeableness from their influence target.

In psychotherapy
Closely associated with reverse psychology in psychotherapy is the technique of "the Paradoxical intervention....This technique has also been called 'prescribing the symptom' and 'antisuggestion. The therapist frames their message so that resistance to it promotes change.

Such interventions "can have a similar impact as humor in helping clients cast their problems in a new light....By going with, not against, the client's resistance, the therapist makes the behavior less attractive". This is referred to as reframing. This means pretending to agree with clients' thoughts and beliefs; reaffirming them out loud to make the clients themselves realize their fallibility.

In relationships 
In personal interpersonal relationships, reverse psychology can be implemented from two perspectives. On the one hand, it can be used as a manipulative "persuasion tactic" in a negative fashion. Alternatively, it can also be used as a helpful method to benefit relationships

Marketing and decision-making 
Psychology is another word to refer to "perception, analyzing and focusing on other people's decisions." Throughout history, this has been utilized in many ways. A common one would be games. In certain card games, the idea is to make the person focus on the REVERSE of what they think they are paying attention to. 

Modern marketing and advertising strategies use similar techniques. Although these studies have not been consistently shown in laboratory settings, and the results are often inconclusive, reverse psychology is often considered a controversial topic, and results from experiments are not always consistent. Nevertheless, it has still profoundly impacted how we study perception in psychology and behavior."

Paradoxical marketing

"In a world where it is expected that all things should be available ... less availability" has emerged as a new selling point: "by engaging in such a restricted anti-marketing ploy, the brand has won kudos." The result can be "what the Japanese call a secret brand ... no regular retail outlets, no catalog, no web presence apart from a few cryptic mentions ... people like it because it's almost impossible to find". Such an example of a brand is Cayce Pollard's "The Gabriel Hounds".

Adorno and Horkheimer
Theodor Adorno and Max Horkheimer characterized the effect of the culture industry as "psychoanalysis in reverse". Their analysis began with the dialectic which operated in Germany when heirs of the Romantic movement became seekers of "Strength through Joy", only to have their movement co-opted by a combination of the mass media and National Socialism. A modern example begins with the "fitness and jogging" boom in the United States in the 1970s. The "running craze" at the Boston Marathon and in California, dialectically, was the thesis that one did not have to be "Rocky" in a sweaty gym to be physically fit, and that body acceptance was the key to effective aerobic training. The culture industry responded to the thesis with major advertising campaigns from Calvin Klein and others, using images featuring exceptionally toned models. People compared themselves to these models, which created a sense of competition, and many high school students avoid jogging because of the resultant body shame.  
  
The culture industry mass-produces standardized material. This would not be dangerous if the material was meaningless, but it frequently offers and reinforces ideals and norms representing implied criticism of those who fail to match up. Empirical studies show that mass culture products can lower confidence and self-esteem, and cause humiliation among men and women whose particular characteristics fall outside the normalized range for appearance, behaviour, religion, ethnicity, etc. Similarly, advertising frequently seeks to create a need to buy by showing differences between actual and ideal situations. The intention is usually to induce dissatisfaction with the present situation and to induce expectations of satisfaction through the acquisition of products that will transform the actual reality into the idealized reality. Hence, if the peer group buys, all those who cannot afford the products will feel additional unhappiness and frustration until they eventually join the group. Thus, sometimes the process of advocacy for one outcome intends to produce the opposite outcome as the motivation for purchase.  
  
However, more often than not, the cause and effect are unintended. Marxist logic applied to the culture industry indicates that it is, per se, a dialectic in which declining profit margins and increasing costs make investors anxious for "sure things". Repeating winning formulas and stereotyping create the lowest common denominator products with the lowest costs. But the less creative the input, the more likely it becomes that roles will be cast in ways that match, rather than challenge, common prejudices which can inadvertently (or quite deliberately) damage the esteem of those in the marginalized groups.

In popular culture

Classic examples of reverse psychology in popular culture include a large, bright red button with a sign next to it saying "Do not push", or a sign saying "Jump at your own risk".

There are numerous examples of reverse psychology in fiction, cinema, and cartoons, including William Shakespeare's Julius Caesar where Mark Antony uses reverse psychology to get the townspeople to cause a riot. Mark Antony pretends to side with Brutus by complimenting his deeds which have led to Caesar's murder, while actually inciting the crowd's anger.

In one of Joel Chandler Harris's Uncle Remus stories, Br'er Rabbit escaped from Br'er Fox by repeatedly pleading "Please, Br'er Fox, don't fling me in that briar patch." "The fox did so, which allowed the rabbit to escape: The Rabbit used 'reverse psychology' to outsmart the Fox."

In Edgar Allan Poe's The Cask of Amontillado, Montresor uses reverse psychology to persuade Fortunato to enter his vaults. He says that Fortunato is too tired and should get some rest and that he should find someone else to help him with his wine tasting problem. Montresor knew that Fortunato would disagree and insisted on entering the vault, leading him into his death by immurement.

The Swedish fictional character Alfie Atkins uses reverse psychology in the children's book You're a Sly One, Alfie Atkins! from 1977. He exaggerates his own childishness in order to convince his older cousins to sit at the grown-up table.

One of the most famous examples of reverse psychology in popular culture is a gag in the Looney Tunes cartoon Rabbit Fire. While Bugs Bunny and Daffy Duck are arguing over whether it's Duck Season or Rabbit Season, Bugs suddenly switches sides and says "Rabbit Season", throwing Daffy off and resulting in him arguing for Duck Season, and getting himself shot.

In the 1988 film Who Framed Roger Rabbit, Eddie Valiant, in order to save Roger from being executed by Judge Doom, tricks him into drinking liquor (which Roger is allergic to) by using reverse psychology. It is done in the same manner as the Looney Tunes example above, and it's most likely a reference.

In the 1992 Disney film Aladdin, the titular character, upon freeing the Genie from the lamp, uses reverse psychology to trick the Genie into freeing him from the Cave of Wonders, without using one of his three wishes to do so.

A popular example of reverse psychology in media is the release of Queen's hit song "Bohemian Rhapsody". Upon release, the band was told the song was too long to ever be played on the radio, running at 5 minutes and 55 seconds. To overcome this, the band gave the song to Kenny Everett of Capital Radio and made him promise not to play it. Everett in fact did play the song, and the band's plan worked, with the song becoming number one on the UK singles chart for nine weeks.

See also

 Devil's advocate
 Double bind
 Streisand effect

References

Further reading
 Gerald R. Weeks, Promoting Change through Paradoxical Therapy (1991)

Sociological theories
Popular psychology